Failan is a 2001 South Korean film written and directed by Song Hae-sung. The film was adapted from the Japanese novel Love Letter by Jirō Asada. It stars Choi Min-sik and Hong Kong actress Cecilia Cheung.

Plot
After losing both her parents, Failan (Cecilia Cheung) immigrates to Korea to seek her only remaining relatives. Once she reaches Korea, she finds out that her relatives have moved to Canada well over a year ago. Desperate to stay and make a living in Korea, Failan is forced to have an arranged marriage through a match-making agency. Kang-jae (Choi Min-sik) is an old and outdated gangster who has no respect from his peers. Short on money, Kang-jae decides to take on the arranged marriage. Having nothing more than a picture of Kang-jae, Failan spends her days dreaming and wishing that Kang-jae would come to visit her. Failan often writes to Kang-jae in sorrow about how much she misses and thinks about him, but never has the nerve to give the letters to Kang-jae. Things take a turn when Kang-jae is asked by his boss to take the fall for a murder in exchange for some money. The only hope in his worthless life is the wife he never met.

Cast
 Cecilia Cheung as Failan
 Choi Min-sik as Kang-jae
 Son Byong-ho
 Gong Hyung-jin
 Kim Ji-young
 Min Kyung-jin
 Ji Dae-han
 Kim Hae-gon
 Kim Kyung-ae
 Kim Kwang-sik
 Gong Yoo-seok
 Jung Dae-hoon
 Kim Su-hyeon

Awards 
2001 Blue Dragon Film Awards 
 Best Director: Song Hae-sung
 Best Actor: Choi Min-sik

2001 Busan Film Critics Awards
 Best Actor: Choi Min-sik

2001 Director's Cut Awards
 Best Director: Song Hae-sung
 Best Actor: Choi Min-sik

2002 Deauville Asian Film Festival
 Lotus d'Or (Prix du Jury) ("Jury Prize"): Failan
 Lotus du Meilleur Réalisateur ("Best Director"): Song Hae-sung
 Lotus du Meilleur Acteur ("Best Actor"): Choi Min-sik
 Lotus du Public (Prix du Public) ("Audience Choice Award"): Failan

2002 Grand Bell Awards
 Best Director: Song Hae-sung
 Jury Prize

References

External links 
 
 
 
 Failan review at Koreanfilm.org
 Failan review at MediaCircus.net
 Failan review at LoveHKFilm.com
 Failan review at AsianMovieWeb

2001 films
2001 romantic drama films
South Korean gangster films
Films based on Japanese novels
Films directed by Song Hae-sung
2000s Korean-language films
South Korean romantic drama films
2000s South Korean films